The Women's Welsh Open was a women's professional golf tournament on the Ladies European Tour.
 
The tournament was first played in 1995 at St Pierre Golf & Country Club in Chepstow, Wales, venue of the 1996 Solheim Cup. Laura Davies was the inaugural champion.

Winners

References

External links
Official Ladies European Tour Website

Former Ladies European Tour events
Golf tournaments in Wales